The sport climbing competition at the 2022 World Games took place from 14 to 16 July 2022, at the Sloss Furnaces, Birmingham, United States. Originally scheduled to take place in July 2021, the Games were rescheduled for July 2022 as a result of the 2020 Summer Olympics postponement due to the COVID-19 pandemic.

Qualification
Athletes qualified for the World Games through their placement in various international and continental championships held in 2020 and 2021. If a quota for a particular event is not used, then it is allocated to the next eligible athlete in the same event.

Participating nations
59 climbers from 17 nations participated.

Medal table

Events

Men

Women

References

External links
 The World Games 2022
 International Federation of Sport Climbing
 Results book

 
2022 World Games
World Games